The 1999 Lafayette Leopards football team was an American football team that represented Lafayette College during the 1999 NCAA Division I-AA football season. Lafayette tied for second-to-last in the Patriot League.

In their 19th and final year under head coach Bill Russo, the Leopards compiled a 4–7 record. John Fistner, Jim Goff and Chad Williamson were the team captains.

The Leopards were outscored 271 to 207. Lafayette's 2–4 conference tied for fifth place in the seven-team Patriot League standings.

Lafayette played its home games at Fisher Field on College Hill in Easton, Pennsylvania.

Schedule

References

Lafayette
Lafayette Leopards football seasons
Lafayette Leopards football